The 2009–10 Süper Lig (known as the Turkcell Süper Lig for sponsorship reasons) was the 52nd season since its establishment. The season commenced on 7 August 2009 with Istanbul B.B. hosting defending champions Beşiktaş at Atatürk Olympic Stadium. The last matches were played on 16 May 2010.

Bursaspor won the league beating defending champions Beşiktaş 2–1 at home. They beat second placed Fenerbahçe by just one point after they could only manage a 1–1 home draw against Trabzonspor. It was only the seventh time a club outside the Istanbul Big Three have won the league, with Trabzonspor being the only other team with six championships, winning their last title in 1984.

Promotion and relegation from 2008–09 
Konyaspor, Kocaelispor and Hacettepe SK were relegated at the end of the 2008–09 season after finishing in the bottom three places of the standings. Konyaspor had to face demotion after six years in the highest Turkish football league. Kocaelispor returned to the First League after just one year in the Süper Lig, while Hacettepe ended a two-year stint in the Turkish top flight.

The relegated teams were replaced by 2008–09 TFF First League champions Manisaspor, runners-up Diyarbakırspor and promotion play-off winners Kasımpaşa. Manisaspor and Kasımpaşa made an immediate return to the Süper Lig while Diyarbakırspor returned after a three-year hiatus.

Team overview

Managerial changes

During summer break 
Nine teams decided to change their head coach in the offseason, among them Fenerbahçe and Galatasaray.

After start of the 2009–10 season

League table

Positions by round

Results

Top scorers
Source: Süper Lig official website

Hat-tricks

References

See also 
2009–10 Türkiye Kupası
2009–10 TFF First League

Süper Lig seasons
Turkey
1